The South Fork Republican River is a river that arises in Lincoln County, Colorado, United States, and flows east-northeastward for about  through Kit Carson and Yuma Counties, Colorado, and Cheyenne County, Kansas, to a confluence with the Republican River in Dundy County, Nebraska. Bonny Reservoir is located on the South Fork Republican River in Yuma County, Colorado.

Use of water from the South Fork Republican River is governed by the Republican River Compact, a water agreement among the U.S. states of Colorado, Kansas Nebraska signed on 12-31-1942

See also
List of rivers in Colorado
List of rivers in Kansas
List of rivers in Nebraska
Colorado drainage basins

References

External links
Republican River Compact

Rivers of Colorado
Rivers of Kansas
Rivers of Nebraska
Bodies of water of Dundy County, Nebraska
Tributaries of the Kansas River
Rivers of Lincoln County, Colorado
Rivers of Kit Carson County, Colorado
Bodies of water of Cheyenne County, Kansas
Rivers of Yuma County, Colorado